The D. H. Regan House at 507 S. DeLeon in Victoria, Texas, United States, is an Italianate architecture home designed by architect Jules Leffland.  It was built in 1880.  It was listed on the National Register of Historic Places in 1986.

It was listed on the NRHP as part of a study which listed numerous historic resources in the Victoria area.

It is one of the "highly embellished, but rigidly symmetrical, houses built in the 1870s" that demonstrate a change from "mid-century classicism" in architecture in the Victoria area.

Like the Huck-Welder House, it is one of the homes and businesses that were moved after devastating storms hit the coastal community of Indianola, a port on the Matagorda Bay, in 1875 (the third storm in the 1875 hurricane season) and in 1886 (the devastating 1886 Indianola hurricane).

See also

National Register of Historic Places listings in Victoria County, Texas
Recorded Texas Historic Landmarks in Victoria County

References

Houses completed in 1880
Houses in Victoria, Texas
Houses on the National Register of Historic Places in Texas
Italianate architecture in Texas
National Register of Historic Places in Victoria, Texas
Recorded Texas Historic Landmarks